B'zaah is a town located  east of the city of al-Bab in northern-central Aleppo Governorate, northwestern Syria. It is administratively part of Nahiya al-Bab in al-Bab District. The town had a population of 12,718 as per the 2004 census. The residents of Bizaah are mostly Arabs and Turks with a Kurdish minority.

History 
During the Roman Empire the town was known as Beselatha, which became Buza'a in the Middle Ages.

Medieval era 
Located on the road to Aleppo, Bizaah was captured during attempts to siege the main city. The first was in early 1119, when Roger of Antioch captured it from the Turcoman prince Ilghazi of Mardin. While the second was in 1138, during the Byzantine Emperor John II Komnenos campaign in Syria.

Syrian Civil War 

During the Syrian Civil War in the summer of 2013 Islamic State of Iraq and Syria had a presence in the town and by mid-November 2013, was in full control of the town. On 23 February 2017, the Turkish-backed Free Syrian Army and other affiliated rebels captured the town.

Notable people
 Sayf Balud

References

Bibliography
 

Populated places in al-Bab District